Streptomyces cinerochromogenes is a bacterium species from the genus of Streptomyces which has been isolated from soil from Tama Graveyard in Tokyo in Japan. Streptomyces cinerochromogenes produces and cineromycin A and cineromycin B.

See also 
 List of Streptomyces species

References

Further reading

External links
Type strain of Streptomyces cinerochromogenes at BacDive -  the Bacterial Diversity Metadatabase

cinerochromogenes
Bacteria described in 1966